Hadeel Ibrahim (born September 1983) is a Sudanese-British philanthropist.

Early life
Hadeel Ibrahim was born in September 1983. Her father, Mohammed Ibrahim, is a Sudanese billionaire businessman. Her mother, Hania Morsi Fadl, is a radiologist and founder of the Khartoum Breast Cancer Clinic. She has a bachelor's degree in Politics and Philosophy from the University of Bristol.

Philanthropy
Ibrahim has served as the founding executive director of the Mo Ibrahim Foundation since 2006. She serves on the board of directors of the Clinton Foundation, the Mary Robinson Foundation for Climate Justice and the Synergos Institute. She also serves as the co-chair of the board of directors of The Africa Center, and on the council of advisors of Refugees International. She is a patron of Restless Development.

Personal life
Ibrahim resides in London, England.

References

Living people
1983 births
English people of Sudanese descent
Philanthropists from London
Alumni of the University of Bristol
Clinton Foundation people